Maurice Richlin (February 23, 1920 – November 13, 1990) was an American screenwriter. He received two Academy Award for Best Original Screenplay nominations for Pillow Talk and Operation Petticoat in the same year. For the first of which he won along with Russell Rouse, Stanley Shapiro and Clarence Greene.

Richlin served in the U.S. Army during World War II.

He co-wrote the original treatment, story and screenplay, The Pink Panther.

He wrote All in a Night's Work, Come September, Soldier in the Rain, For Pete's Sake.

He wrote the story for What Did You Do in the War, Daddy?.

He had an extensive career writing in radio and later, television, before his film career.

His son is the famous artist Lance Richlin.

References

External links 
 

1920 births
1990 deaths
Best Original Screenplay Academy Award winners
American male screenwriters
20th-century American male writers
20th-century American screenwriters